The National Shrine of Saint Jude Thaddeus or Saint Jude Parish (originally known as Espíritu Santo Chinese Parish) is one of three Chinese parishes established by the Roman Catholic Archdiocese of Manila in Metro Manila, Philippines. 

The shrine holds its novena service every Thursday to Saint Jude, whose traditional color is green. Its annual fiesta is held every October 28, the Feast of Saints Jude Thaddeus and Simon the Zealot. The shrine is popular with students and those reviewing for board examinations, as Jude Thaddeus is considered the patron saint of hopeless cases. 

The shrine is located at J.P. Laurel Street, San Miguel, Manila which is inside the Malacañang Palace Complex. The current parish priest and shrine rector is Rev. Fr. Linus E. Nicasio, SVD. He is assisted by Rev. Fr. Christopher Ramirez, SVD and Rev. Fr. Yuhang Antonio Wang, SVD.

History

Background 
The Chinese presence in the Philippines goes back many centuries. During the Spanish colonization of the Philippines, the Dominicans built their dwelling places near the homes of the Sangleys (from the Hokkien 生意 sengli, "business" or "trade" ). Evangelization of the Chinese started in 1588 but Chinese revolts during the 18th century resulted in the placing of the Chinese ministry under the secular clergy, which led to the attachment of the Chinese parish to Binondo Parish until 1954.

As the Chinese community swelled during those periods, the Binondo Parish, then the only Chinese parish in Manila, was considered insufficient. Thus, the faculty to erect three more Chinese parishes was obtained by Archbishop Rufino Santos from the Roman Consistorial Congregation on July 23, 1954. Those three parishes were to be located in the Paco district of Manila, Pasay and northeastern Metro Manila or Quezon City.

Establishment 
After receiving the commission for the churches, Espíritu Santo Chinese Parish in the Santa Cruz district was canonically erected. On October 13, 1954, Father Provincial Hermann Kondring, SVD appointed Fr. Henry Windges, SVD as the first parish priest. He was installed by Archbishop Santos on November 14, 1954. Fr. Peter Tsao, SVD was subsequently appointed assistant parish priest on December 7, 1954. The first rectory was in a portion of Riverside Hospital (now the Saint Jude Catholic School) which was rented for that purpose in January 1955. Saint Jude Thaddeus was made patron saint of the parish after a month by Cardinal Santos as proposed by Father Provincial Herman Kondring, SVD.

The blessing and laying of the church's cornerstone was held there on September 28, 1958. It was then consecrated on October 23, 1960, with then-First Lady Leonila Dimataga-García, who performed the ribbon cutting ceremony. At the time, the church had no windows. The St. Jude Annex was completed and blessed by Msgr. Buenaventura López on February 27, 1968.

The first organization established by Fr. Henry Windges, SVD in 1955 was the Praesidium Marias Spes Sinensium of the Legion of Mary. With the setting up of the parish council, other organizations followed: Filipino-Chinese Catholic Youth, Altar Servers, Catholic Women's League, St. Jude Foundation, Kerygma Lectors, Ichtys Choir, Mother Butler's Guild, St. Jude Ladies' Association, Pax Et Bonum Choir, Special Ministers for the Holy Communion, Couples for Christ, the Greeters and Collectors Ministry, and the Friends of St. Jude.

When Fr. Windges returned to Germany, Fr. Tsao was appointed quasi-parish priest on March 29, 1957 and officially installed as parish priest on March 1, 1958 by Msgr. Jesús Tison. Rev. Fr. Bernard Doyle, SVD was appointed assistant parish priest on May 20, 1957, while Rev. Fr. Peter Yang, SVD was designated parochial vicar on May 7, 1959 who were both appointed by Rufino Cardinal J. Santos, DD.

On March 12, 1966, Cardinal Santos installed Rev. Fr. Peter Tsao, SVD as Vicar General for the Chinese in Manila.

Sometime in 1968, Rev. Fr. Charles Tchou was appointed assistant parish priest. Upon completion, Msgr. Buenaventura Lopez blessed the St. Jude Annex Building on February 27, 1968. The parish hall was blessed by Jaime Cardinal Sin, DD, on November 13, 1983.

While remaining a personal parish for the Chinese and Chinese Filipinos, St. Jude Parish became also a territorial parish on June 20, 1986 and took overseas adjacent to the parish church composed of four barangays that were formerly under the jurisdiction of San Miguel Parish.

On October 25, 1986, Cardinal Sin appointed Rev. Fr. Thomas Cassidy, SVD as assistant parish priest.

From April 1995 to April 1999, Fr. Teodoro P. Gapuz, SVD was acting parish priest with Rev. Fr. Joseph Vu, SVD as parochial vicar.

In May 1999, Fr. Teodor P. Gapuz, SVD, was appointed Director of St. Jude Catholic School, and Rev. Fr. John O'Mahony, SVD took over as acting parish priest of St. Jude Archdiocesan Shrine with the following parochial vicars: Rev. Fr. Isabelo San Luis, SVD; Rev. Rodgrigo Advincula, SVD; and Rev. Fr. Leopoldo C. Jaucian, SVD, with Rev. Roland Aquino, SVD, the deacon then who assisted on weekends.

Fr. Leopoldo C. Jaucian succeeded  Msgr. Peter Tsao  was appointed parish priest at St. Jude Archdiocesan Shrine on July 25, 2000, and installed by Cardinal L. Sin on August 19, 2000.

On July 27, 2001, Fr. Ricardo C. Miranda, SVD and Rev. Fr. Joseph Xin Lu, SVD were appointed parochial vicar and attached priest respectively.

In 2005, Fr. Roland Aquino, SVD was installed as the parish priest of the Shrine.

Elevation to national shrine and 21st century 
St. Jude Parish became a territorial parish on June 20, 1986, and was separated from the parish of San Miguel. It was renamed the "Archdiocesan Shrine of Saint Jude Thaddeus" on June 21, 1994, following a petition by Msgr. Peter Tsao and the parishioners, and as a result of the increasing number of devotees that visit the shrine on Thursdays for the weekly novena service.

During the term of Rev. Fr. Roland Aquino, SVD as parish priest and shrine rector, in February 2010, the shrine was elevated as national shrine through a decree of establishment issued by the CBCP President and Tandag Bishop Nereo Odchimar. The elevation of the status of the Archdiocesan Shrine of St. Jude Thaddeus into national shrine was unanimously approved by the Catholic Bishops Conference of the Philippines (CBCP) during its 100th plenary assembly on January 23.

Manila Archbishop Gaudencio Cardinal Rosales endorsed the petition to the CBCP giving assurance “that all canonical and liturgical requirements for the elevation to the status of being a National Shrine have been complied with.”

On the year 2014, during the last year of Fr. Roland Aquino, SVD  as parish priest and shrine rector, the Shrine celebrated its 60th Anniversary. The celebrations and activities for the shrine's 60th anniversary was launched on February 2, 2014, by Cardinal Luis Antonio G. Tagle, Archbishop of Manila. The anniversary culminated on October 28, 2014, the feast day of St. Jude Thaddeus, with Cardinal Luis Antonio G. Tagle blessing the shrine's new bell tower and presiding the Feast Day Pontifical High Mass together with almost 75 priest concelebrants.

In February 2015, Fr. Linus Nicasio, SVD, from the Sacred Heart of Jesus Parish in Kamuning, Quezon City and who previously served as the principal of St. Jude Catholic School, was installed by Most Rev. Broderick Pabillo, DD, Auxiliary Bishop of Manila, as the parish priest and shrine rector.

The Thursday Novena 
The weekly novena to St. Jude began in June 1959 and has been held every Thursday since then. The devotion spread over the years and has become very popular in Metro Manila, with devotees including students, board examination reviewees, office workers, parishioners, and all walks of life.

Thursday is always a busy day, with preaching, confessions, and counselling forming an important part of the work. Masses and novenas are scheduled hourly throughout the day from early morning until evening. Huge crowds overflow the church into the church grounds every Thursday. As a result of this, the church was conferred the title of Archdiocesan Shrine of St. Jude on June 21, 1994.

Papal visits 

Modern popes have made it a point to make the long journey to Catholic Philippines, with the country hosting four popes in a span of 45 years.

In 1970, Pope Paul VI came as a missionary pope and visited the slums of Tondo, Manila.

A decade later, Pope John Paul II came to raise the Philippines’ protomartyr, Lorenzo Ruiz, to beatify him and his companion martyrs.

John Paul II returned in 1995 for the 1995 World Youth Day in Manila. Prior to 2015, the concluding Mass of his visit was the largest human gathering in history. For Filipinos, papal visits have been a source of joy, strength, and most importantly, hope. Pope Francis visited in 2015, and his concluding Mass broke the 1995 record.

As absolute monarch of Vatican City State, Popes are formally received by the President of Philippines to Malacañan Palace, the President’a official residence and principal workplace. The Shrine is located inside the Palace Complex, so visiting Popes en route to the Palace often pass by it.

Parish Priests and Other Priests Assigned 

Since its establishment, the shrine is under the pastoral care of the Society of the Divine Word (SVD).

The following is a list of the priests who were assigned in the shrine since 1954:

1.	Rev. Fr. Henry Windges, S.V.D. (as Espiritu Santo Chinese Parish) – 1954
 Assistant Parish Priest:  Rev. Fr. Peter Tsao, S.V.D.

2.	Rev. Fr. Peter Tsao, S.V.D. – 1957 (appointed) /1958 (installed)
 Assistant Parish Priests:  Rev. Fr. Bernard Doyle, S.V.D. / Rev. Fr. Charles Tchou, S.V.D. / Rev. Fr. Thomas Cassidy, S.V.D.
 Parochial Vicar: Rev. Fr. Peter Yang, S.V.D.

3.	Rev. Fr. Teodoro P. Gapuz, S.V.D. – 1995 (acting parish priest)
 Parochial Vicar: Rev. Fr. Joseph Vu, S.V.D.

4.	Rev. Fr. John O'Mahony, S.V.D. – 1999 (acting parish priest)
 Parochial Vicars: Rev. Fr. Isabelo San Luis, S.V.D. / Rev. Fr. Rodrigo Advincula, S.V.D. / Rev. Fr. Leopoldo C. Jaucian, S.V.D.

5.	Rev. Fr. (now Bishop) Leopoldo C. Jaucian, S.V.D. – 2000 – 2005 
 Parochial Vicar: Rev. Fr. Ricardo C. Miranda, S.V.D.
 Attached Priest: Rev. Fr. Joseph Xin Lu, S.V.D.

6.	Rev. Fr. Roland U. Aquino, S.V.D. – 2005 – 2015
 Assistant Parish Priests:  Rev. Fr. Antonio Enacmal, S.V.D. / Rev. Fr. Ramon Bosch, S.V.D.
 Parochial Vicar: Rev. Fr. Joseph Xin Lu, S.V.D.
 Attached Priests: Rev. Fr. Peter Mei Li, S.V.D. / Rev. Fr. Flaviano Villanueva, S.V.D. / Rev. Fr. Christopher Ramirez, S.V.D. / Rev. Fr. Yuhang Antonio Wang, S.V.D.

7.	Rev. Fr. Linus E. Nicasio, S.V.D. – 2015 – present 
 Assistant Parish Priest: Rev. Fr. Yuhang Antonio Wang, S.V.D.
 Parochial Vicar: Rev. Fr. Christopher Ramirez, S.V.D.
 Confessor: Rev. Fr. Antonio Enacmal, S.V.D. (retired)

Jubilee hymn 
There are several songs and hymns used in the Shrine during the Thursday novena service that can be readily found in the official novena booklet.

The one below, which is not included in the booklet, was composed for the Shrine's 60th Anniversary and since then, is often sung after Mass or novena service as the recessional.

With joyful hearts we sing this song to you

Our Dear Saint Jude Thaddeus, our patron saint,

By your help and intercession, God has heard our cries and pleas

We are grateful that we have you, Saint Jude, we are one in you

We are grateful that we have you, Saint Jude, we are one in you

References

External links 

Roman Catholic churches in Manila
Buildings and structures in San Miguel, Manila
Malacañang Palace
Roman Catholic national shrines in the Philippines
Churches in the Roman Catholic Archdiocese of Manila